Martu may refer to:

 Amorites, ancient Middle Eastern people, known as MAR.TU in the Sumerian language
 Amurru (god), the deity worshiped by the Amorite, also known as Martu
 Martu people, Australian Aboriginal people